Vicente Ramos or Entil (born December 28, 1985) is an East Timorese football player. He is the current midfielder for the Timor-Leste national football team.

References

External links
Entil

1985 births
Living people
East Timorese footballers
Association football midfielders
Timor-Leste international footballers